Bordertown Café is a Canadian drama film, originally released in 1991. The screenplay was written by Kelly Rebar based on her award-winning 1987 play of the same name, and the film was directed by Norma Bailey. The film stars Janet Wright and Susan Hogan. Set in Alberta, Bordertown Café was filmed outside of Warren, Manitoba.

Hogan plays Marlene, the divorced owner of a small café in a rural Alberta town near the Canada–United States border, whose life is turned upside down when her son Jimmy (Gordon Michael Woolvett) is offered the opportunity to go live with his father and his father's new wife in the States.

Wright plays Maxine, Marlene's mother and Jimmy's grandmother. She won the Genie Award for Best Performance by an Actress in a Leading Role at the 13th Genie Awards ceremony. Rebar was also nominated for Best Adapted Screenplay, and Lara Mazur was nominated for Best Editing.

References

External links

1991 films
English-language Canadian films
Canadian drama films
Films set in Alberta
Canada–United States border
Films shot in Montana
Films directed by Norma Bailey
Films based on Canadian plays
1991 drama films
1990s English-language films
1990s Canadian films